Estevan Regional Aerodrome  is an aerodrome located  north of Estevan, Saskatchewan, Canada.

See also 
List of airports in Saskatchewan
Estevan (South) Airport
Estevan/Bryant Airport
Estevan (Blue Sky) Aerodrome
RCAF Station Estevan
RCAF Aerodrome Chandler
RCAF Aerodrome Outram

References

External links

Registered aerodromes in Saskatchewan
Estevan No. 5, Saskatchewan
Transport in Estevan